Knichtland Burn is a burn which marks the boundary of the parish of Huntly, Aberdeenshire, Scotland.

References

Rivers of Aberdeenshire